Ilinden Peak is an ice-covered peak rising to 620 m in Breznik Heights on Greenwich Island, Antarctica.  The peak has precipitous and partly ice-free south slopes, and surmounts Zheravna Glacier to the south, Solis Glacier to the northwest, and Fuerza Aérea Glacier to the north-northeast.

The feature is "named after the settlement of Ilinden in Southwestern Bulgaria, in connection with the 1903 Bulgarian uprising of Ilinden-Preobrazhenie for the liberation of Macedonia and Odrin (Adrianople) Thrace".

Location
British mapping in 1968, Bulgarian topographic survey Tangra 2004/05 and mapping in 2009.

See also
 Breznik Heights
 Greenwich Island

Maps
 L.L. Ivanov et al. Antarctica: Livingston Island and Greenwich Island, South Shetland Islands. Scale 1:100000 topographic map. Sofia: Antarctic Place-names Commission of Bulgaria, 2005.
 L.L. Ivanov. Antarctica: Livingston Island and Greenwich, Robert, Snow and Smith Islands. Scale 1:120000 topographic map.  Troyan: Manfred Wörner Foundation, 2009.

Notes

References
 Bulgarian Antarctic Gazetteer. Antarctic Place-names Commission. (details in Bulgarian, basic data in English)

External links
 Ilinden Peak. Copernix satellite image

Mountains of Greenwich Island
Bulgaria and the Antarctic